Mapping of Airline Traffic over Internet Protocol (MATIP) is a communication protocol defined by RFC 2351. It uses the well-known ports 350 and 351. It has been created for the use by computer applications to carry airline reservation, ticketing, and messaging traffic. 

MATIP is preferred over classic Airline Traffic lines because:
 it allows to use low-cost tcp/ip global networks instead airline-specific networks
 it will decrease the number of communications sessions to manage
 current airline booking terminals and programs can be used with MATIP without the need of replacement

External links 
New "type-X" proposal and brief history of MATIP
MATIP technical specifications
Overview of MATIP

Internet protocols